Ascaptesyle purpurascens is a moth of the subfamily Arctiinae. It was described by Rothschild in 1913. It is found in Peru.

References

Moths described in 1913
Lithosiini
Moths of South America